Mulhall's Greatest Catch is a 1926 American silent drama film directed by Harry Garson and starring Maurice 'Lefty' Flynn, Kathleen Myers and Henry Victor. It is also known by the alternative title of When Heroes Love.

Cast
 Maurice 'Lefty' Flynn as Joe Mulhall
 Kathleen Myers as Nora McCarren 
 Henry Victor as Otto Nelson 
 Harry Dunkinson as Con McCarren 
 Harry Arras as Capt. Collins

References

Bibliography
 Phillips, Alastair & Vincendeau, Ginette. Journeys of Desire: European Actors in Hollywood. British Film Institute, 2006.

External links

1926 films
1926 drama films
Silent American drama films
Films directed by Harry Garson
American silent feature films
1920s English-language films
Film Booking Offices of America films
American black-and-white films
1920s American films